Carlo Di Maria (born 12 December 1906, date of death unknown) was an Italian architect. His work was part of the architecture event in the art competition at the 1948 Summer Olympics.

References

External links
 

1906 births
Year of death missing
20th-century Italian architects
Olympic competitors in art competitions
Architects from Palermo